Wenman Coke (ca. 1717 – 11 April 1776), known as Wenman Roberts until 1750, was a British landowner and politician who sat in the House of Commons between 1753 and 1776.

Background

Born Wenman Roberts, he was the son of Major Philip Roberts (a grandson of Sir Francis Wenman, 1st Baronet) and Anne Coke, daughter of Edward Coke and Carey Newton. He assumed the surname of Coke (pronounced "Cook") in lieu of his patronymic in 1750. In 1759 he succeeded to the substantial estates of his uncle, Thomas Coke, 1st Earl of Leicester, including the Coke family seat of Holkham Hall, Norfolk.  Wenman's great-great grandfather, Sir Lewes Roberts (1596–1641), was a British merchant with the Levant and East India companies and an economist/writer on foreign commerce topics.  Wenman's mother, Anne Coke, descended from Sir Edward Coke and from Thomas Osborne, 1st Duke of Leeds on her father, Edward Coke's side.  Anne Coke descended from Mary Boleyn Carey and Sir John Newton on her mother, Carey Newton's side. Anne Coke's grandfather, Sir John Newton, 3rd Baronet, was a third cousin of Sir Isaac Newton.

Political career
Coke was returned to Parliament for Derby in 1772. At the 1774 general election he was returned for both Derby and Norfolk, and chose to sit for the latter. He continued to represent this constituency until his death two years later.

Family

Wenman Coke died in 1776. He had married Elizabeth Chamberlayne, daughter of George Chamberlayne and had several children, including Thomas William Coke, 1st Earl of Leicester (6 May 1754 – 30 June 1842) and Edward Coke (b. 28 June 1758). His wife survived him by over 30 years and died in 1810.

His son Thomas succeeded him to Holkham Hall and, as Member of Parliament for Norfolk, he became an influential agricultural reformer.  In 1837 the Earldom of Leicester was revived in his favour.

References

1710s births
1776 deaths
Year of birth uncertain
British MPs 1747–1754
British MPs 1754–1761
British MPs 1761–1768
British MPs 1768–1774
British MPs 1774–1780
Members of the Parliament of Great Britain for Harwich
Members of the Parliament of Great Britain for Okehampton
Members of the Parliament of Great Britain for Norfolk
Wenman
Members of the Parliament of Great Britain for Derby